Pisco Vuanga (born 12 September 1982) is a retired Congolese football goalkeeper.

References 

1982 births
Living people
Democratic Republic of the Congo footballers
Democratic Republic of the Congo international footballers
Association football goalkeepers
AS Vita Club players
SC Cilu players
AS New Soger players